George Henry Ivor Baldock (Greek: Τζορτζ Μπόλντοκ; born 9 March 1993) is a professional footballer who plays as a right back for  club Sheffield United. Born in England, he plays for the Greece national team.

Club career

Milton Keynes Dons
Baldock was born in Buckingham, Buckinghamshire. He started his career playing for Milton Keynes Dons' academy team. His older brother Sam Baldock also played for the club.

2009–10
Baldock made his first-team debut for Milton Keynes Dons on 1 May 2010 in the League One clash with Brighton & Hove Albion at the Stadium:mk which ended in 0–0 draw, coming on as a substitute for Daniel Powell in the 81st minute.

2010–11
Baldock made his full debut for the club on the last day of the 2010–11 season in a League One match against Oldham Athletic.

2011–12
On 30 October 2011, he joined Northampton Town on a month's loan. In March 2012 he joined Tamworth on loan, along with teammate Charlie Collins. He made his debut in a 1–1 league draw against Gateshead and completed the full match.

2012–13
On 3 May 2012, he joined Icelandic Úrvalsdeild club ÍBV on a one-month loan. He made his debut for the club three days later in the opening match of the 2012 season, a 1–2 defeat away at Selfoss. Baldock was handed a one-match ban on 5 June 2012 after collecting four yellow cards in his first six games. He scored his first goal for ÍBV on 20 June 2012 in the 3–1 away win over Grindavík before being substituted for Ragnar Leósson. The following day, the club announced that Baldock's loan spell had been extended until 8 August, meaning he would be eligible to participate in the Europa League qualifying campaign. On 3 July 2012, he was given a further one-match suspension after becoming the first player of the season in the Icelandic leagues to reach the limit of seven yellow cards in league and cup matches. Nevertheless, he made his first appearance in European competition two days later after being selected in the starting line-up for the 0–1 defeat to Irish outfit St Patrick's Athletic in the first leg of the Europa League first qualifying round.

ÍBV announced on 9 August 2012 that Baldock's loan spell with the club had been extended until the end of the month.

Following his return from his loan at ÍBV, Baldock linked up on loan once again with Conference Premier club Tamworth. He signed with the club until the end of year, along with Dons teammates Charlie Collins and Jordan Ivey-Ward. George scored his first goal for Tamworth against Woking in a 3–2 victory. On 19 December 2012, Baldock scored twice for Tamworth as they beat Corby Town away 4–2 in the FA Trophy second-round replay.

2014–15
Baldock featured several times for Milton Keynes Dons in the first half of the 2014–15 season, including as part of the team involved in the memorable 4–0 win over Manchester United in the second round of the League Cup on 26 August 2015.

On 12 February 2015, Baldock signed a loan deal till the end of the 2014–15 season with League Two club Oxford United. He went on to play 12 games for the club, He scored a late equaliser in the 1–1 home draw with Morecambe.

2015–16
Baldock returned to Oxford on a season-long loan on 30 June 2015. During his loan Baldock established himself as an integral part of the team, later being named in the 2015–16 League 2 PFA Team of the Year for his performances with Oxford.

On 28 January 2016, after he impressed during his loan spell with the club, Milton Keynes Dons announced that Baldock had been recalled.

On 3 May 2016, having claimed a place as a regular first-team player, Baldock was named the club's Young Player of the Year 2015/16 at the club's end-of-season awards.

2016–17
On 29 July 2016, Baldock signed a contract extension with Milton Keynes Dons, keeping him at the club until the summer of 2018. On 26 November 2016, Baldock made his 100th appearance for the club in a 1–2 win away versus Coventry City.

Sheffield United
On 13 June 2017, Baldock was reunited with former Oxford manager Chris Wilder when he joined newly promoted Championship club Sheffield United, on a three-year deal for an undisclosed fee. On 28 April 2019, Baldock saw the Blades secure promotion to the Premier League following a 12-year absence. On the 19 August 2019 Baldock signed a new 3-year contract at the club.
On 12 December 2020, Baldock signed a new four-year deal with The Blades, keeping him at the club until 2024.

International career
Baldock is of Greek descent through his grandmother, and is thus eligible to represent Greece at an international level as well as England. On 27 May 2022, he was called up to the Greece national team by Head Coach Gus Poyet for the first time ahead of their 2022–23 UEFA Nations League June fixtures.

On the 2 June 2022, Baldock made his debut for Greece in a 1–0 win over Northern Ireland at Windsor Park in Belfast.

Personal life
His elder brother Sam Baldock is also a professional footballer and currently plays for League One side Oxford United, where his other elder brother James is the club doctor.

Career statistics

Club

International

Honours
Sheffield United
EFL Championship runner-up: 2018–19

Individual
Milton Keynes Dons Academy Player of the Year: 2010–11
Milton Keynes Dons Young Player of the Year: 2015–16
PFA Team of the Year: 2015–16 League Two

References

External links

Profile at the Sheffield United F.C. website

1993 births
Living people
People from Buckingham
Footballers from Buckinghamshire
Greek footballers
Greece international footballers
English footballers
Greek people of English descent
English people of Greek descent
Association football defenders
Milton Keynes Dons F.C. players
Northampton Town F.C. players
Tamworth F.C. players
Íþróttabandalag Vestmannaeyja players
Oxford United F.C. players
Sheffield United F.C. players
English Football League players
National League (English football) players
Premier League players
English expatriate footballers
Expatriate footballers in Iceland
English expatriate sportspeople in Iceland